A dale is an open valley.  Dale is a synonym of the word valley.  The name is used when describing the physical geography of an area.  It is used most frequently in the Lowlands of Scotland and in the North of England; the term "fell" commonly refers to the mountains or hills that flank the dale.

Etymology
The word dale comes from the Old English word dæl, from which the word "dell" is also derived.  It is also related to Old Norse word dalr (and the modern Icelandic word dalur), which may perhaps have influenced its survival in northern England. The Germanic origin is assumed to be *dala-. Dal- in various combinations is common in placenames in Norway. Modern English valley and French vallée are presumably not related to dale. A distant relative of dale is currency unit dollar, stemming from German thaler or daler, short for joachimsthaler coins manufactured in the town of Joachimsthal in Bohemia.

The word is perhaps related to Welsh dol (meadow, pasture, valley), Russian dol (valley, reverse side) and Serbian/Croatian/Bulgarian/Russian dolina (basin, doline is a geological term for certain surface depressions in karst areas). There is semantic equivalency to many words and phrases, suggesting a common Indo-European affinity.  Vale and thalweg are also related.

Examples 
The following are several examples of major dales that have the name dale. The river name is usually appended with "-dale". There are also many smaller dales; this is not an exhaustive list (see dale (place name element) for more).

 Airedale (Yorkshire)
 Annandale (Dumfries & Galloway)
 Calderdale (Yorkshire)
 Clydesdale (Lanarkshire)
 Coquetdale (Northumberland)
 Eskdale (Cumbria)
 Eskdale (Dumfries & Galloway)
 Eskdale  (Yorkshire)
 Lauderdale (Scottish Borders)
 Lonsdale (or Lunesdale, valley of the Lune, Lancashire-Cumbria)
 Nithsdale (Dumfries & Galloway)
 Rochdale (Greater Manchester)
 Rosendale Village (New York)
 Teesdale (Durham)
 Tweeddale (Scottish Borders)
 Tynedale (Northumberland)
 Weardale (Durham)
 Wensleydale (or Yoredale, valley of the Ure, Yorkshire)
 Wuppertal (North Rhine-Westphalia)

References

Landforms
Bodies of water
Slope landforms
Valleys